Egedal Kommune is a municipality (Danish, kommune) in Region Hovedstaden in Denmark. January 2022).

History 
On 1 January 2007 Egedal municipality was created as the result of Kommunalreformen ("The Municipal Reform" of 2007), consisting of the former municipalities of Ledøje-Smørum (Copenhagen County), Ølstykke (Frederiksborg County), and  Stenløse (Frederiksborg County).

Locations

Politics

Municipal council
Egedal's municipal council consists of 21 members, elected every four years.

Below are the municipal councils elected since the Municipal Reform of 2007.

References 

 Municipal statistics: NetBorger Kommunefakta, delivered from KMD aka Kommunedata (Municipal Data)
 Municipal mergers and neighbors: Eniro new municipalities map

External links 

 
 The new Egedal Municipality's official website (Danish only)

 
Municipalities in the Capital Region of Denmark
Municipalities of Denmark
Populated places established in 2007